The Casa del Sacramento (House of Sacrament), also called the Archbishop's House, is a colonial building located in Santo Domingo, Dominican Republic. It was built in 1523 by conquistador Diego Caballero, by the time secretary of the Real Audiencia of Santo Domingo, the house has two towers in the facade. On a time during the colony and now it is the residence of the Archbishop of Santo Domingo.

It is part of the UNESCO World Heritage Site "Colonial City of Santo Domingo".

History and description
The Casa del Sacramento was built in 1523 with brick and stone. The exterior facade is from 1523, although the towers were added in 1931. It has an early-colonial brown cloister rounded by preserved large early-colonial pillars rising to both floors. It was originally two houses but in 1931 was blended into a large building.

Here lived the Luis de Garay's family, and later Alfonso de Fuenmayor the first Archbishop of the Cathedral of Santo Domingo. Also, Bernard Phillipe Alejo Carré during the Haitian occupation to the country lived here. It also became an annex of the University of Santo Domingo in 1905. At the present it is the residence of the Archbishop of Santo Domingo.

See also
List of colonial buildings in Santo Domingo

References

Buildings and structures in Santo Domingo
Ciudad Colonial (Santo Domingo)
1523 establishments in the Spanish West Indies
Houses completed in 1523
Episcopal palaces